César Alexis Bravo Castillo (born 25 April 1973) is a Chilean football manager and former player who played as a defender, currently in charge of Trasandino.

Club career
As a player, Bravo represented Cobreloa, Everton de Viña del Mar, Provincial Osorno and Ñublense in his home country.

In Indonesia, he played for PSIM Yogyakarta, where he coincided with his compatriot Jaime Sandoval, Persikota Tangerang, Persema Malang and PSLS Lhokseumawe.

Managerial career
After working as manager of Unión Española until the 2022 season, he signed with Trasandino in the Segunda División Profesional de Chile for the 2023 season.

References

External links
 
 

1973 births
Living people
Footballers from Santiago
Chilean footballers
Association football defenders
Cobreloa footballers
Everton de Viña del Mar footballers
Provincial Osorno footballers
PSIM Yogyakarta players
Persikota Tangerang players
Persema Malang players
Ñublense footballers
PSLS Lhokseumawe players
Chilean Primera División players
Primera B de Chile players
Indonesian Premier Division players
Liga 2 (Indonesia) players
Chilean expatriate footballers
Chilean expatriate sportspeople in Indonesia
Expatriate footballers in Indonesia
Chilean football managers
Cobreloa managers
Unión Española managers
Trasandino de Los Andes managers
Primera B de Chile managers
Chilean Primera División managers
Segunda División Profesional de Chile managers